The 2020–21 Gibraltar Women's Football League is the fifth season of 11-a-side women's football in Gibraltar since the territory joined UEFA in 2013, and FIFA in 2016. The league had been in operation for a number of years previously, but teams were ineligible for entry to the UEFA Women's Champions League as it was only a 9-a-side tournament. Lincoln Red Imps Women were the reigning champions, but disbanded their women's team in summer 2020.

After only two games, the league paused on 15 December 2020, before resuming on 25 May 2021. While the first two games of the season were played at Victoria Stadium, resurfacing at the ground meant that the restarted league was played on pitch at the Devil's Tower Camp, with permission from Gibraltar's Ministry of Defence.

Teams
Lincoln Red Imps disbanded their women's team in summer 2020, with Lynx replacing them. Europa Point had initially declared their intention to form a team this year, but the COVID-19 pandemic halted their plans.

Note: Flags indicate national team as has been defined under FIFA eligibility rules. Players may hold more than one non-FIFA nationality.

League table

Results

Season statistics

Top scorers

Hat-tricks

Clean sheets

References

External links
Association website

2020–21 domestic women's association football leagues
Football leagues in Gibraltar
Gibraltar Women's Football League, 2020-21